Zafra exilis is a small species of sea snail in the family Columbellidae, the dove snails.

Description
The shell size is approximately 3.7 mm.

Distribution
This species is distributed in the Red Sea and as an introduced species along the Canary Islands.

References

 Vine, P. (1986). Red Sea Invertebrates. Immel Publishing, London. 224 pp.
 

exilis
Gastropods described in 1849
Taxa named by Rodolfo Amando Philippi